Snus is a tobacco product, originating from a variant of dry snuff in early 18th-century Sweden. It is placed between the upper lip and gum for extended periods, as a form of sublabial administration. Snus is not fermented. Although used similarly to American dipping tobacco, snus does not typically result in the need for spitting and, unlike naswar, snus is steam-pasteurized. 

The sale of snus is illegal in all the European Union countries except for Sweden. It is the most common type of tobacco product in Norway (which is not in the EU), and is available in Switzerland as well. Some EU countries like Estonia allow the sale of nicotine pouches, snus-like products that contain nicotine but no tobacco. Snus is also available in the United States. Canada makes it difficult to obtain snus through its high taxes on imported tobacco products.

Snus has been seen as an alternative to smoking, vaping, chewing, dipping, and dissolvable and snuff tobacco products.

Snus usually contains nicotine, which can lead to nicotine addiction. The chemical constituents of different types of snus vary, and population-level studies suggest that the disease risks vary as well.

History

One of the first to take a medicinal interest in tobacco was Jean Nicot (1530-1600), a French diplomat in Portugal who grew tobacco in his garden. Nicot dried and ground the tobacco leaves to a fine powder as one could snort (snuff). The powder was offered to Catherine de’ Medici (1519-1589), the Queen of France, as to relieve her of migraines that she suffered from. Snuff quickly became a fashion among the court and upper-class citizens of France.  The using of nasal snuff also spread to Sweden at the beginning of the 17th century. Tobacco use spread so much in Sweden that in 1724 King Fredrik I decreed that Swedes had to grow their own tobacco. Farmers and homesteaders began to grind their own homegrown tobacco. But instead of snorting it, they mixed it to a mush and left it to ferment in jars for several weeks. The end result was taken in portions and put under the lip. It became known as snus.

The oldest and most widely known brand is Ljunglöf's Ettan that still today uses the original formula from 1822. Jakob Fredrik Ljunglöf introduced a new manufacturing process called pasteurization that made the snus longer lasting, cleaner from harmful elements and cut the production time by several weeks. Other manufacturers refined the process of making snus and many brands flourished in the years to follow. Several brands from that era are still on the market today.

Swedish parliament decided in 1914 to nationalize its entire tobacco industry. Hundreds of tobacco companies were turned into AB Svenska Tobakmonopolet, with the state as its owner. Two years later available products dropped from about four hundred to only seventeen. Employees in the industry declined by fifty percent. In the 1960s the international free trade developed which meant that Sweden removed the import and sales monopoly on tobacco. AB Svenska Tobaksmonopolet later merged with the match manufacturer Swedish Match and was listed on the stock market in 1996.

Types

Many types of snus are available:
Loose snus (Swedish: lössnus) is a moist powder which can be portioned and packed into a cylindrical or spherical shape with the fingertips or a purpose-made cylindrical device. The end result is often referred to as a pris (pinch), buga, prilla, or prell (slang).  Some users (usually long-time users) simply pinch the tobacco and place it under their upper lip (farmer's pinch or living snus). Over time, the demand for loose snus has been replaced by portioned varieties.  Many users of snus today prefer the discreet nature of the latter variety.
Portion snus (Swedish: portionssnus) is packaged moist powder in small teabag-like sachets. It comes in smaller quantities than the loose powder, but is considered more convenient and discreet than loose snus. The two varieties of portion snus are:
 Original portion, introduced in 1973, is the traditional form. The sachet material is moisturized during the manufacturing process, resulting in a brown, moist pouch.
 White portion is a milder-tasting and slightly slower-release form. The sachet material is not moisturized during the manufacturing process, resulting in a white, dry pouch. The tobacco within the portion material has the same moisture content as original portion snus, but the nicotine and flavor are somewhat slower in delivery due to the drier sachet. "White portion" refers to the style, not the color, as many white portion snus use a black material instead of white, yet are "white portion".  Examples include General Onyx and Grovsnus Svart (Black) and Blue Ocean (Blue).
 Sting-free portion is a patent-approved  snus pouch, introducing a protective side, that reduces the stinging sensation and irritation to the snus user's gum and oral mucous membrane.

Portioned snus is available in three different sizes: mini, normal/large (most common) and maxi, which are somewhat rare. The weights may vary, but the labelling on most packages of snus disclose their net weight. Mini portions typically weigh close to 0.5 g, normal (large) portions weigh around .8 to 1 gram, and maxi portions weigh up to 1.7 g, depending on brand. Some brands also offer the choice of regular and long (slimmer but longer) versions of the normal size sachet, which are similar in content weight. These long portions differ from traditional sachets in that they are slimmer but longer, in order to fit against the gums more comfortably.

The nicotine content of snus varies among brands, with the most common strength being 8 mg of nicotine per gram of tobacco. Snus manufacturers have released stark (strong or stark/sterk) and extra stark (extra strong or extra stark/sterk) varieties with greater nicotine content.  There is no legal definition for these terms, they are just used for marketing purposes to differentiate the different strengths. Stark varieties contain, on average, 11 mg to 14 mg of nicotine per gram of tobacco, while extra stark varieties may contain up to 22 mg of nicotine per gram of tobacco. Recently, the Siberia brand released its "Extremely Strong" snus which boasts 43 mg of nicotine per gram of tobacco and is currently the highest nicotine-per-gram snus available.

Tobacco substitutes

One variation of snus is tobacco-free snus, which is in fact a snus substitute rather than snus. This snus-like product uses black tea leaves or other herbs, with salts and flavorings, and has no tobacco content. Like snus, it is available either loose or, more commonly, in bags, which are sometimes known as pods. Even though it is not made from tobacco, most retailers in Sweden will not sell it to people under the age of 18. 

Tobacco-free snus was introduced by the Swedish company Nonico with the brand Choice in 2003. Swedish Match launched their competing brand Onico in 2006. At first, it was made with corn starch but in 2008, the formula was changed when it was found to cause dental issues due to the sugar created.

Tobacco-free snus have opened up a new market in the EU, where regular snus with tobacco cannot be sold due to regulations.

A nicotine pouch is a white preportioned pouch containing nicotine. It is like snus, but does not contain tobacco leaf. Nicotine pouches use plant fibers with added nicotine instead of tobacco. Since the plant fiber is tasteless, it allows manufacturers to make nicotine pouches in a much broader selection of flavors compared to traditional snus with tobacco. Nicotine pouches are usually longer lasting and have a longer shelf-life than traditional snus. Nicotine pouches are regulated differently around the world. In some countries, like Norway and Canada, their sale in general stores are banned because they are classified as a new nicotine product. In other countries, including many EU countries, they are sold freely, because they do not classify as a tobacco product like snus, due to their lack of tobacco.

Nicotine pouches are available in a broader selection of nicotine strengths than tobaccos snus since the nicotine is added during the production. With tobacco snus, the strength depends on the type of tobacco and the production method since most manufacturers never add any additional nicotine during the production.

Differences from similar tobacco products

Some forms of tobacco consumed in the mouth may be categorized as:
Swedish snus is a moist form of smokeless tobacco which is usually placed under the upper lip, and which does not result in the need for spitting.  It is sold either as a moist powder known as loose snus, or packaged into pouches known as portion snus. Snus is often mildly flavored with food-grade smoke aroma, bergamot, citrus, juniper berry, herbs and/or floral flavors.  Most Scandinavian snus is produced in Sweden and regulated as food under the Swedish Food Act.
American snus, available since the late 1990s, is similar to the Scandinavian form, but usually has a lower moisture content and lower pH, resulting in lower bioavailability of nicotine than Scandinavian varieties, meaning less is available for absorption.  American snus is often flavored, e.g., with spearmint, wintergreen, vanilla or fruit (e.g. cherry), and may contain sugar.
Nasal snuff (mostly English, German, and Scandinavian), referred to as luktsnus in Swedish and luktesnus in Norwegian, and as "Scotch snuff"  in the US, is a dry, powdered form of snuff. It is insufflated – "sniffed" but not deeply "snorted" – through the nose.  It is often mentholated or otherwise scented.
Chewing tobacco (North American, European), also known as chew (or in some Southern US dialects as chaw or “dip”), is tobacco in the form of short or long, loose leaf and stem strands (like pipe tobacco or longer), or less commonly of chopped leaves and stems compressed into blocks called plugs, or even finely ground pieces compressed into pellets. A few brands are cut into much finer loose strands, like cigarette rolling tobacco. Chew is placed between the cheek and the gums, or actively chewed.  It causes copious salivation, especially when chewed, and due to its irritant (even nauseating) effect on the esophagus, this "juice" usually requires spitting. Chewing tobacco is a long-established North American form of tobacco (derived from traditional use of raw tobacco leaf by Indigenous peoples of the Americas), and is also legal in the European Union.  Chewing tobacco is sometimes flavored, e.g. with wintergreen, apple, or cherry.
Dipping tobacco (North American), also known as dip, spit tobacco or, ambiguously, as moist snuff, is a common American form of tobacco (also available in Canada and Mexico). It is moist, and somewhat finely ground, but less so than snus. Dipping tobacco (so called because users dip their fingers into the package to pinch a portion to insert into the mouth) is placed between the lower lip or cheek and the gums; it is not used nasally. As with chewing tobacco, salivation is copious, and usually spat out.  Dipping tobacco is usually flavored, traditionally with wintergreen or mint, though many other flavorings are now available, while some unflavored brands remain popular.  Beginning in the mid 1980s, several brands have packaged American dipping tobacco in porous pouches like those used for many brands of Scandinavian and American snus. 
Chema (Algerian) is a moist tobacco similar to Scandinavian snus in many respects. Outside of Algeria, it is most widely known as "Makla", a name that originates from the Algerian brand "Makla El Hilal", which first produced this type of smokeless tobacco during the French colonization. It is placed in the upper lip in a manner similar to snus; it differs in that it is more finely ground and has an even higher nicotine content and pH level. Sales within the European Union are legal due to its classification as a chewing tobacco. Its safety in comparison to snus has not been studied sufficiently.
Naswar (Central Asian) is a moist, powdered form of tobacco, often green and sometimes caked with the mineral lime and/or wood ash. It is used like dipping tobacco or put under the tongue, and is pungent and often heavily flavored, e.g. with culinary oils (cardamom, sesame), the fruit lime, menthol, etc.

Snus, dry snuff, and dipping tobacco are distinct products that English speaking people often call snuff but are processed and used in very different ways, each with their own sets of risks.

Often, the word "snuff" is used to refer to the nasal form of tobacco (nasal snuff). The same is true of American dipping tobacco which is known in America simply as snuff . Outside of the US, cured moist snuff that is applied to the lower lip, and that requires spitting (American: snuff), is simply called American dipping tobacco.

Usage 
Snus is typically used by being placed under the upper lip. This is true for both loose snus and portion snus.  The pris (pellet of loose snus) or pouch is typically left in place for anywhere between 30 and 120 minutes.  No spitting is required.

Snus is not cured, so it can spoil much faster than cured tobacco.  While snus is typically refrigerated for short term storage (up to a few months), it is typically frozen for longer term storage of a year or more. It can stay unrefrigerated for a week or more without spoilage.  Some snus products are shipped very dry, so they have extended shelf life without needing any refrigeration.  This makes them slower to initially "drip", as there is no appreciable moisture in the packet.

Contents
Swedish snus is made from air-dried tobacco from various parts of the world. In earlier times, tobacco for making snus was laid out for drying in Scania and Mälardalen, Sweden. Later, Kentucky tobaccos were used. The ground tobacco is mixed with water, salt, an alkalizing agent (typically, E500), and aroma, and is prepared through heating. After the heating process, food grade aromas are typically added. In Sweden, snus is regulated as a food product and, for this reason, all ingredients are listed on the label of each individual package (can) of snus. Moist snus contains more than 50% water, and the average use of snus in Sweden is approximately 800 grams (16 units) per person each year. About 12% (1.1 million people) of the population in Sweden use snus. Unlike dipping tobacco and chew, most snus today does not undergo the fermentation process, but is instead steam-pasteurized. Although steam-pasteurization is remarkably complex, it has the advantages of inhibiting the growth of bacteria that facilitate the formation of tobacco-specific nitrosamines, while preserving the desired texture and mouthfeel of the snus. The absorption of nicotine, the addictive substance in tobacco, from snus depends on the level of nicotine in the snus and the pH level in the box. A voluntary quality standard for snus products has been introduced (Gothiatek) that sets maximum levels for certain controversial constituents including nitrosamines, heavy metals, and polyaromatic hydrocarbons. Most manufacturers of Scandinavian type snus adhere to this standard.

Snus is sold in small tins which, in the earlier years, were made of porcelain, wood, silver, or gold.  Portioned snus usually comes in plastic tins of 20 to 24 portions, containing about .75 to 1 gram of snus each, while loose snus is mostly sold in wax coated cardboard containers with plastic lids (similar to dip snuff), at 42 g (50 g before 2008). Mini-portion and medium-portion snus are increasingly popular formats. Most of these products come in tins containing 20 portions, of either 0.65 or 0.5 grams each for a total of just under 13 or 10 grams, particularly with those for whom concealing their use of smokeless tobacco in places is of utmost importance.

Industry
Snus is sold primarily in Sweden, Faroe Islands and Norway, and has more recently been introduced to South Africa, in the Pacific islands and the U.S. It is illegal to sell in the European Union, apart from in Sweden. Despite snus being banned for sale in the EU, it can often be found for sale in places frequented by Scandinavian tourists, such as Chania in Greece.

Although Swedish snus was previously only available by mail order in the US, an increasing number of tobacco retailers have now begun to stock it. R. J. Reynolds Tobacco Company, Philip Morris USA, and U.S. Smokeless Tobacco Company, and American Snuff Company now produce Americanized versions under the brands Camel Snus, Grizzly Snus, and Skoal snus, (with Philip Morris formerly producing snus under the Marlboro brand) respectively. While American snus is packaged in much the same way (moist tobacco in a small pouch), production methods vary considerably from traditional Swedish methods. Additionally, differences in the way American snus is formulated may diminish some of its possible health benefits over other tobacco products. Swedish Match, the leading manufacturer of Swedish snus, is currently test-marketing snus in Canada, Russia, and several regions throughout the US.

Health effects

A study of almost 10,000 Swedish, male construction workers published in the International Journal of Cancer in 2008 found a statistically significant increase in the incidence of the combined category of oral and pharyngeal cancer among daily users of snus. Other studies and opinion pieces in renowned journals, such as the British Medical Journal and The Lancet, do not confirm any correlation between snus usage and oral cancer, but one study suggests a probable increased risk of pancreatic cancer as a result of snus use. A pooled analysis of nine prospective studies involving more than 400,000 men and published in the International Journal of Cancer in 2017 found that use of snus was not associated with a greater risk for pancreatic cancer.

The European Union banned the sale of snus in 1992, after a 1985 World Health Organization (WHO) study concluded that "oral use of snuffs of the types used in North America and western Europe is carcinogenic to humans", but a WHO committee on tobacco has also acknowledged the evidence is inconclusive regarding health consequences for snus consumers. Only Sweden and European Free Trade Association (EFTA)-member Norway are exempt from this ban. A popular movement during the run-up to the 1994 referendum for Sweden's EU membership made exemption from the EU sale ban of snus a condition of the membership treaty.

Recent actions by many European governments to limit the use of cigarettes has led to calls to lift the ban on snus, as it is generally considered to be less harmful than cigarette smoke, both to the user  and to others.
Recently, the news agency AFP reported that the number of people dying from cancer in the United States has decreased by a third since 1991. The decrease is linked to a reduced use of cigarettes, which is a well-known factor for developing lung cancer. However, no reference is apparently made to snus, or to other forms of cancer.

Europe has a high rate of smoking, with 15 countries qualifying for the top 20 countries in the world for smoking per capita. This is reflected in the statistics on the number of deaths from lung cancer in the EU 
at 34 per 100,000 inhabitants. Men in the age group 50-54 are over-represented when it comes to deaths from lung cancer.
In Sweden where smoking is relatively uncommon, the number of lung cancer-related deaths is 14 per 100,000 inhabitants. One conclusion is that this is a result of a long snus tradition in the country. It is therefore possible that substitution of cigarettes with snus might save lives. However, snus is highly addictive, and it is associated with various oral cancers, making a policy of replacing tobacco with snus at least problematic.

Since snus is not inhaled it does not affect the lungs as cigarettes, cigars and pipe tobacco do. Because it is steam-pasteurized rather than fire-cured like smoking tobacco or other chewing tobacco, it contains lower concentrations of nitrosamines and other carcinogens that form from the partially anaerobic heating of proteins - 2.8 parts per million for Ettan brand, compared to as high as 127.9 parts per million in some American brands. WHO acknowledges Swedish men have the lowest rate of lung cancer in Europe, partly due to the low tobacco smoking rate, but does not argue for substituting snus for smoking, stating that the effects of snus still remain unclear. Around 2005, several reports, partially funded by the snus industry, indicated that no carcinogenic effects could be attributed to Nordic snus, and this resulted in the removal of the warning label that claimed snus could cause cancer. It was replaced with the more general label "May affect your health negatively". Research is continuing, but no conclusive reports have been made regarding major adverse health effects of snus.

A 2014 report commissioned by Public Health England on electronic cigarettes concluded that snus has a risk profile that includes possible increases in the risk of oesophageal and pancreatic cancer. The report stated that snus use is not associated with an increase in the risk of having a myocardial infarction, but is associated with an increased risk of dying from one if a person does have one. The report also concluded that there is no increased risk of COPD or lung cancer.

Snus manufacturer Swedish Match filed a modified risk tobacco product (MRTP) application with the U.S. Food and Drug Administration (FDA) Center for Tobacco Products to modify the warning label requirements by:

 removing the current warnings, "This product can cause mouth cancer" and "This product can cause gum disease and tooth loss."
 replacing the current warning, "This product is not a safe alternative to cigarettes,” with “No tobacco product is safe, but this product presents substantially lower risks to health than cigarettes."
 retaining the current warning, "Smokeless tobacco is addictive."

The FDA's Tobacco Products Scientific Advisory Committee voted against the request in April 2015 but Swedish Match is continuing their efforts for this change.

R. J. Reynolds has also filed an MRTP application with the FDA for its Camel snus product. , the FDA has yet to issue a ruling.

Medical journal The Lancet  published a major study, "Global, regional, and national comparative risk assessment of 84 behavioural, environmental and occupational, and metabolic risks or clusters of risks, 1990–2016: a systematic analysis for the Global Burden of Disease Study 2016", in November 2017. The scientific conclusions with regards to snus was the following. "There is sufficient evidence that chewing tobacco and other products of similar toxicity cause excess risk of oral and oesophageal cancer while, at this time, existing evidence does not support attributing burden to snus or similar smokeless tobacco products." ...while for snus or snuff we did not find sufficient evidence of a RR (relative risk) greater than one for any health outcome." A relative risk [RR] of 1.0, means you are average - [there is no difference in risk between the control and experimental groups]".

During pregnancy and breastfeeding, mothers are advised not to use any products containing nicotine, which harms the fetus.

Scandinavian snus is regularly available, refrigerated, in the United States at smokeshops and select gas stations, especially in major cities. The considerably different, sweetened American snus is more commonly found at convenience stores, in multiple brands produced by US-based cigarette companies. Neither product category has made much of an inroad into the market-share held by the dipping tobacco products more common in that country.

The burning sensation often experienced with snus is caused by the nicotine itself (similar to the tingle of nicotine gum) and some food additives such as sodium carbonate (E500). Sodium carbonate is a food additive used to increase the pH of the tobacco (reduce the acidity).  This increases the bioavailability of the nicotine, meaning more is available for absorption. Mucous membranes readily absorb free nicotine. Some flavorings (mints in particular) are astringent and may increase the tingling or burning sensation.

Public health debate
There is some debate among public health researchers over the use of "safer" tobacco or nicotine delivery systems, generally dividing along two lines of thought. Some (primarily in the European Union and Canada) believe in "tobacco harm reduction", with the general belief that while it should remain a goal to reduce addiction to nicotine in the population as a whole, the reduction of harm to the health of those who choose to use nicotine is more pragmatic than the desire to reduce overall nicotine addiction. In other words, people using more harmful forms of tobacco (e.g., cigarettes) should be encouraged to switch to less harmful products (e.g., snus). The other school of thought is that no tobacco product should be promoted, and that attention should be placed instead on getting users to switch to nicotine replacement therapy or quit altogether.

One proponent of using snus for harm reduction is Karl Fagerström, who has a PhD in psychology and is researcher in smoking cessation in Sweden.  Some research available today shows snus use reduces or eliminates the risk of cancers associated with the use of other tobacco products, such as chewing tobacco (the type primarily used in the US and Canada, created in a process similar to cigarette tobacco) and cigarettes. The widespread use of snus by Swedish men (estimated at 30% of Swedish male ex-smokers), displacing tobacco smoking and other varieties of snuff, is thought to be responsible for the incidence of tobacco-related mortality in men being significantly lower in Sweden than any other European country . In contrast, since women traditionally are less likely to use snus, their rate of tobacco-related deaths in Sweden can be compared to that of other European countries.

Snus may be less harmful than other tobacco products (see above).  According to Kenneth Warner, director of the University of Michigan Tobacco Research Network, "The Swedish government has studied this stuff to death and, to date, there is no compelling evidence that it has any adverse health consequences. … Whatever they eventually find out, it is dramatically less dangerous than smoking."

A 2014 report commissioned by Public Health England on another avenue for tobacco harm reduction, electronic cigarettes, examined the case of snus as "a unique natural experiment in the impact of a socially accepted, non-medical, affordable and easily accessible reduced harm product on the prevalence of tobacco smoking".  They concluded that "Although controversial, the Swedish natural experiment demonstrates that despite dual use and primary uptake of the reduced-harm product by young people, availability of reduced-harm alternatives for tobacco smokers can have a beneficial effect. While snus is not likely to become a legal or indeed politically viable option in the UK, this data proves the concept that harm reduction strategies can contribute to significant reductions in smoking prevalence."

Ongoing discussion and debates among primary scientific researchers of the effects of snus use on life expectancy appear to indicate a significant increase in life expectancy among persons who previously smoked tobacco and switch to snus, depending on the age of the persons who switch, even when it is assumed that 100% of the risk of cardiovascular diseases among smokers transfers to snus users. This study determined that "for net harm to occur, 14-25 ex-smokers would have to start using snus to offset the health gain from every smoker who switched to snus." It is also noted, in the correspondence seen in the previous citation, that concerns about the effect of marketing by the tobacco industry, as influenced by the results of these scientific studies, is of primary concern to many researchers in the field, including the risk of emboldening the industry to attempt to increase snus sales among young people and promote dual-use of snus and smoked tobacco, and the use of medical nicotine, rather than snus, can better target at-risk populations, given better access and pricing.

However, a growing consensus among researchers of smoking cessation have found nicotine replacement therapy (NRT) products to have limited effectiveness because tobacco users may be seeking the combination of MAO inhibitors (which are found in tobacco) and nicotine, or that NRT products do not deliver sufficient quantities of nicotine. MAO inhibitors in tobacco act to amplify the rewarding effects of nicotine, but may also act as a form of self-medication for people with depression. This could explain the association between mental illness and smoking, but a confounding variable is that chronic nicotine administration itself has been shown to desensitize nicotine receptors over time and lead to antidepressant effects. Smoking cessation itself is strongly associated with reduced depression, anxiety, and stress and improved positive mood and quality of life compared with continuing to smoke. It has been hypothesized that snus' success when compared with conventional NRT as a cigarette substitute could be attributed to its MAO inhibiting properties. However, studies seem to suggest that for MAO inhibition, tobacco has to be pyrolysized (i.e., ignited as in cigarettes, cigars, and pipes). The competing theory is that the success of snus as a smoking alternative is due to its ability to deliver nicotine similar to that acquired through cigarettes, and twice as high as that acquired through NRT. Furthermore, the use of snus, similar to cigarettes, offers a choice of brand, aesthetic rituals of use, and tastes of tobacco and thus has sensory effects that NRT products perhaps lack. The use of daily snus for smoking cessation has had a 54% success rate for complete abstinence, and a 60% success rate for great reduction in cigarette consumption.

Opponents of snus sales maintain, nevertheless, that even the low nitrosamine levels in snus cannot be completely risk-free, but snus proponents point out that, inasmuch as snus is used as a substitute for smoking or a means to quit smoking, the net overall effect is positive, similar to the effect of nicotine patches.

In addition, this eliminates any exposure to second-hand smoke, further reducing possible harm to other non-tobacco users. This is seen by public health advocates who believe in "harm reduction" as a reason for recommending snus, as well as other NRTs, rather than continued use of methods of tobacco consumption that result in second-hand smoke.

This does not, however, eliminate any harm to health caused by the nicotine itself. Current research focuses on possible long-term side effects of nicotine on blood pressure, hypertension, and possible risk of pancreatic cancer due to tobacco-specific nitrosamines (TSNAs). TSNAs are the only component of tobacco shown to induce pancreatic cancer in laboratory animals. Nicotine may also exacerbate pancreatic illness, because nicotine stimulates the gastrointestinal tract's production of cholecystokinin, which stimulates pancreatic growth and may be implicated in pancreatic cancer. Thus far, the evidence specifically implicating snus in pancreatic cancer is only suggestive. Notably, the probability of developing pancreatic cancer from cigarettes is higher than the suggested chance of developing pancreatic cancer from snus.

The effect of Swedish snus on blood pressure has been studied at Umeå University in a randomly selected population sample of 4,305 Swedish men between the ages of 25 and 74. In the study, published in November 2008, the researchers found no elevation of blood pressure in snus users who had never been smokers compared to tobacco nonusers. Snus users had lower systolic blood pressure than tobacco nonusers in the unadjusted data.

See also
Chewing tobacco
Nicotine pouch
Pituri
Röda Lacket

References

Further reading

A number of peer-reviewed studies of snus use have been published:

Cardiovascular diseases

Diabetes

Cancer

Smoking cessation

Medical community discussions and reports 
 
The 3rd (2002) International Conference on Smokeless Tobacco - Daily Media Summaries from the U.S. National Cancer Institute
 Discussion of 

 
Swedish words and phrases
Tobacco products